Robert Pierrepont, 1st Earl of Kingston-upon-Hull (6 August 158425 July 1643) was an English nobleman who joined the Royalist side in the English Civil War after some delay and became lieutenant-general of the counties of Lincoln, Rutland, Huntingdon, Cambridge and Norfolk.  He was killed in a friendly fire incident after being captured by Parliamentary forces.

Family
He was the second son of Sir Henry Pierrepont of Holme Pierrepont, Nottinghamshire, and Frances Cavendish, daughter of the Rt. Hon. Sir William Cavendish and Elizabeth Hardwick. His sister became Grace, Lady Manners of Haddon Hall.

He married Gertrude Talbot, daughter of Henry Talbot (1554–1596) (Henry was the son of George Talbot, 6th Earl of Shrewsbury), and Elizabeth Reyner (born 1556) on 8 January 1601 in Overton Longueville, Huntingdonshire.

The earl had five sons, the eldest of whom was his heir Henry Pierrepont, 1st Marquess of Dorchester. Others included Francis Pierrepont (died 1659), a colonel in the parliamentary army and afterwards a member of the Long Parliament, and William Pierrepont (1608–1679), father-in-law of Gilbert Holles, 3rd Earl of Clare, and of Henry Cavendish, 2nd Duke of Newcastle. Robert also had a daughter, Lady Frances (born 1615) who married Philip Rolleston, Esquire.

In 1633 he bought Thoresby Park, where his son Henry built the first Thoresby Hall in 1670.

Education

He became an undergraduate of Oriel College, Oxford, in 1596 and was a benefactor in the rebuilding of the college's Front Quad.

Life

He was Member of Parliament for Nottinghamshire in 1601, became a JP for Nottinghamshire in 1608 and was appointed High Sheriff of Nottinghamshire in 1615. He was created Baron Pierrepont and Viscount Newark in 1627, being made Earl of Kingston-upon-Hull the following year.

He remained neutral on the outbreak of the Civil War, declaring, in what was later taken to be a prophetic curse:

He eventually became a Royalist, joining King Charles, and was appointed lieutenant-general of royal forces in the counties of Lincoln, Rutland, Huntingdon, Cambridge and Norfolk.

Whilst defending Gainsborough he was taken prisoner, and was killed on 25 July 1643, aged 58, while being conveyed to Hull by boat along the River Trent. Royalist forces fired at his captors from the river bank, accidentally killing the Earl whose body was cut in two by a cannonball.

He was succeeded in his peerage by his son Henry. The author Frances Catherine Barnard was a descendant.

References

|-

|-

Cavaliers
Robert
Royalist military personnel of the English Civil War
1584 births
1643 deaths
Alumni of Oriel College, Oxford
English MPs 1601
High Sheriffs of Nottinghamshire
Deaths by firearm in England
People killed in the English Civil War
Military personnel killed by friendly fire
16th-century English nobility
17th-century English nobility
Earls of Kingston-upon-Hull